Java Optimized Processor (JOP)
is a Java processor, an implementation of Java virtual machine (JVM) in hardware.

JOP is free hardware under the GNU General Public License, version 3.

The intention of JOP is to provide a small hardware JVM for embedded real-time systems.  The main feature is the predictability of the execution time of Java bytecodes.  JOP is implemented over an FPGA.

See also

 List of Java virtual machines
 SimpCon

References

External links
 JOP website
 JOP Github repository 
 A Video of a talk given at an embedded Java workshop introduces JOP.

Java virtual machine